Northumberland Islands is a national park in North Queensland, Australia, 763 km northwest of Brisbane.

See also

 Northumberland Islands
 Protected areas of Queensland

References 

National parks of Queensland
Protected areas established in 1994
North Queensland
1994 establishments in Australia